Karambakkam is a census town in Chennai district in the Indian state of Tamil Nadu.

Demographics

Karambakkam has a population of 21,376. Males account for 10,759 people while female count is 10,617. Karambakkam has an average literacy rate of 90.47 percent with the sex ratio of 987, higher than the state average of 80.09 percent, male literacy is 94.85 percent, and female literacy is 85.99 percent. 11.33 percent of the population is under 6 years of age. 88.32 percent of the population describe their occupation as the main work along with 1503 female workers.

Schedule Caste (SC) and Schedule Tribe (ST) constitutes 6.89 percent and 0.14 percent of total population in Karambakkam.

References

Cities and towns in Tiruvallur district